Pilipinas Kong Mahal is one of the most popular patriotic songs in the Philippines. The song was composed by Filipino musician, Francisco Santiago and lyrics by Ildefonso Santos. However, the original text was in English, for "Philippines, my Philippines." It was written by Prescott Ford Jernegan. The musical tune was adapted from the US state song, "Maryland, My Maryland."  Santiago basically kept its tune, and Santos translated the Jernegan text into Filipino for Pilipinas kong Mahal.

In the Philippines, patriotic songs are often sung by people at political rallies, protests and demonstrations. These are also performed in plays and patriotic song or dance numbers, especially in schools during Araw ng Kalayaan (Independence Day) celebrations in June and Buwan ng Wika (Language Month) in August. 

This patriotic song is usually sung during flag retreat ceremonies on Fridays.

Lyrics
Official Filipino lyrics

Official English lyrics

See also
 Filipino nationalism
 Bayan Ko ("My Country")
 Magkaisa ("Unite")

References

Tagalog-language songs
Filipino patriotic songs